Knattspyrnufélag Akureyrar is the handball section of Icelandic sports club KA from Akureyri.

History
KA currently plays in Úrvalsdeild karla. KA had a merged handball team with their rival team Þór Akureyri, from 2006 to 2017, the team was called Akureyri Handboltafélag.

Trophies 
Icelandic Championships (2):
: 1997, 2002
Icelandic Cup: (3):
: 1995, 1996, 2004
Icelandic League Cup : (3):
: 1996, 1998, 2001

Men's team

Current squad
Squad for the 2021-22 season

Goalkeeper
 16  Nicholas Satchwell
 23  Bruno Bernat

Wingers
LW
 22  Arnar Freyr Ársælsson
 33  Jóhann Geir Sævarsson
RW
 3  Óðinn Þór Ríkharðsson
 25  Allan Norðberg

Line players
 17  Pætur Mikkjalsson
 28  Einar Birgir Stefánsson
 41  Haraldur Bolli Heimisson
 44  Ragnar Snær Njálsson

Back players
LB
 10  Skarphéðinn Ívar Einarsson
 11  Ólafur Gústafsson

CB
 4  Patrekur Stefánsson
 6  Arnór Ísak Haddsson
 21  Jón Heiðar Sigurðsson
 23  Ísak Óli Eggertsson

RB
 13  Einar Rafn Eiðsson

Technical staff
Staff for the 2021-22 season

 Head Coach:  Jónatan Magnússon
 Assistant coach:  Sverre Andreas Jakobsson
 Assistant coach:  Heimir Örn Árnason

Notable former players

  Guðjón Valur Sigurðsson
  Arnór Atlason
  Alfreð Gíslason
  Sverre Andreas Jakobsson
    Andrius Stelmokas
    Sergey Zisa
    Erlingur Kristjánsson
  Patrekur Jóhannesson
  Roberto Julián Duranona
  Valdimar Grímsson

Player of the Season

Recent history 
{|class="wikitable"
|-bgcolor="#efefef"
! Season
!
! Pos.
! Pl.
! W
! D
! L
! GS
! GA
! P
!|Playoffs
!Cup
!Notes
|-
|1994-95
|Úrvalsdeild
| align="right" |6
|align="right" |22|| align="right" |10|| align="right" |6|| align="right" |6
|align="right" |544|| align="right" |506|| align="right" |26
|bgcolor=silver|Runner-up    
|bgcolor=gold|Champions    
|
|-
|1995-96
|Úrvalsdeild
| align="right" bgcolor=gold |1
|align="right" |22|| align="right" |18|| align="right" |2|| align="right" |2
|align="right" |612|| align="right" |552|| align="right" |38
|bgcolor=silver|Runner-up    
|bgcolor=gold|Champions    
|EHF Cup 2. round    
|-
|1996-97
|Úrvalsdeild
| align="right" bgcolor=cc9966|3
|align="right" |22|| align="right" |13|| align="right" |1|| align="right" |8
|align="right" |575|| align="right" |562|| align="right" |27
|bgcolor=gold|Champions    
|bgcolor=silver|Final
|EHF Cup Quarter finals    
|-
|1997-98
|Úrvalsdeild
| align="right" |4
|align="right" |22|| align="right" |13|| align="right" |4|| align="right" |5
|align="right" |606|| align="right" |538|| align="right" |30
|Semi-finals    
|First round
|EHF CL Group Stage    
|-
|1998-99
|Úrvalsdeild
| align="right" |6
|align="right" |22|| align="right" |11|| align="right" |0|| align="right" |11
|align="right" |574|| align="right" |558|| align="right" |22
|Quarter finals    
|Quarter-finals
|
|-
|1999-00
|Úrvalsdeild
| align="right" bgcolor=silver|2
|align="right" |22|| align="right" |12|| align="right" |4|| align="right" |6
|align="right" |578|| align="right" |499|| align="right" |28
|Semi-finals    
|Second round
|
|-
|2000-01
|Úrvalsdeild
| align="right" bgcolor=gold |1
|align="right" |22|| align="right" |16|| align="right" |0|| align="right" |6
|align="right" |573|| align="right" |527|| align="right" |32
|bgcolor=silver|Runner-up    
|Quarter-finals
|
|-
|2001-02
|Úrvalsdeild
| align="right" |5
| align="right" |26|| align="right" |11|| align="right" |8|| align="right" |7
| align="right" |677|| align="right" |629|| align="right" |30
|bgcolor=gold|Champions    
|Quarter-finals
|
|-
|2002-03
|Úrvalsdeild
| align="right" |4
| align="right" |26|| align="right" |17|| align="right" |3|| align="right" |6
| align="right" |719|| align="right" |658|| align="right" |37
|Semi-finals    
|Second round
|
|-
|2003-04
|Úrvalsdeild
|align=right|6
|align=right|14|| align="right" |7|| align="right" |0|| align="right" |7
|align=right|439|| align="right" |437|| align="right" |14
|Semi-finals    
|bgcolor=gold|Champions    
|
|-
|2004-05
|Úrvalsdeild
|align=right|6
|align=right|14|| align="right" |5|| align="right" |3|| align="right" |6
|align=right|412|| align="right" |417|| align="right" |13
|Quarter finals    
|Quarter-finals
|
|-
|2005-06
|Úrvalsdeild
|align=right |6
|align=right|26|| align="right" |12|| align="right" |3|| align="right" |11
|align=right|731|| align="right" |717|| align="right" |27
|
||Second round
|EHF Challenge Cup 2.round    
|-
|2017-18
|1.deild
|align=right bgcolor=#DDFFDD| 2
|align=right|18|| align="right" |15|| align="right" |0|| align="right" |3
|align=right|457|| align="right" |369|| align="right" |30
|
||Second round
|Promoted to Úrvalsdeild
|-
|2018-19
|Úrvalsdeild
| align="right" |9
|align="right" |22|| align="right" |7|| align="right" |3|| align="right" |12
|align="right" |570|| align="right" |591|| align="right" |17
||  
|| First round  
|
|-
|2019-20
|Úrvalsdeild
| align="right" |10
|align="right" |20|| align="right" |5|| align="right" |1|| align="right" |14
|align="right" |524|| align="right" |581|| align="right" |11
||  
|| Second round  
|
|-
|2020-21
|Úrvalsdeild
| align="right" |6
|align="right" |22|| align="right" |9|| align="right" |7|| align="right" |6
|align="right" |587|| align="right" |571|| align="right" |25
|| First round
|| Third round  
|
|-
|}

European record

Matches 

Notes
 PR: Preliminary Round
 1R: First round
 2R: Second round
 QF: Quarter finals
 GS: Group stage

Managerial History
 Birgir Björnsson (1978–82)
 Jan Larsen (1982–83)
 Birgir Björnsson (1984–85)
 Ljubo Lazic (1985–86)
 Brynjar Kvaran (1986-1988)
 Ivan Duranec (1988-1989)
 Erlingur Kristjánsson (1989-1991)
 Alfreð Gíslason (1991-1997)
 Atli Hilmarsson (1997-2002)
 Jóhannes Gunnar Bjarnason (2002-2005)
 Reynir Stefánsson (2005-2006)
 Stefán Árnason and Heimir Örn Árnason (2017-2019)
 Stefán Árnason and Jónatan Magnússon (2019-2020)
 Jónatan Magnússon (2020-)

Kit

Women's team 

KA currently has a joint women's team with Þór Akureyri. It goes by the name KA/Þór and as of 2018-2019 season plays in the first tier.

References

External links 

 
 KA Akureyri at EHF 

Handball teams in Iceland
Sport in Akureyri
Knattspyrnufélag Akureyrar